The 1997–98 season was the 65th season in the existence of AS Saint-Étienne and the club's second consecutive season in the second division of French football. In addition to the domestic league, Saint-Étienne participated in this season's edition of the Coupe de France and the Coupe de la Ligue. The season covered the period from 1 July 1997 to 30 June 1998.

Pre-season and friendlies

Competitions

Overview

French Division 2

League table

Results summary

Results by round

Matches

Coupe de France

Coupe de la Ligue

References

External links

AS Saint-Étienne seasons
AS Saint-Étienne